There are several notable bulletin board systems (BBS) for the TI-99/4A home computer.

Technology writer Ron Albright wrote of several BBS applications written for the TI-99/4A in the March 1985 article Touring The Boards in the monthly TI-99/4A magazine MICROpendium. While Albright's article references several notable bulletin board systems, it does not confirm what was the first BBS system written for the TI-99/4A.

Zyolog BBS 
The first commercially available BBS system written for the TI-99/A in 1983 by Dr. Bryan Wilcutt, DC.S, when he was 15 years old.  The name Zyolog was a play on words from Zylog who made low end 8-bit chips and was the first processor type used by the author.  The software was officially copyrighted in 1985.  The Bulletin Board Software was written in a mixture of TI Extended BASIC and TI Assembly Language for the TMS9900 processor.   The author ran the BBS system until moving to the Amiga platform in 1991.  Over 200 Zyolog BBS systems existed world wide.

TIBBS
One of the most popular BBS applications for the TI-99/4A in the early to mid 1980s was aptly named TIBBS (Texas Instruments Bulletin Board System). TIBBS was purported to be the first BBS written to run on the TI-99/4A microcomputer. Its author, Ralph Fowler of Atlanta, Georgia, began the program because he was told by TI's engineers that the machine was not powerful enough to support a BBS. Approximately 200 copies of the application were officially licensed by Fowler and many TIBBS systems popped up around the World. Operators ranged from teenagers to one sysop in Sacramento, California who was over 70 years old. After Texas Instruments ceased producing the 99/4A, its enthusiasts became even more supportive of each other and TIBBS continued into the late 1980s. Eventually Fowler made the program public domain and moved to a different PC platform.

Phillip (P.J.) Holly's BBS
12-year-old programmer Phillip (P.J.) Holly aired a BBS written in TI Extended Basic around late 1982 or early 1983 in the Northwest Chicago suburbs. His code was given to fellow BBS friends, and eventually used as a starting point for the Chicago TI-User's Group BBS, which later was coded in assembly language using TI's Editor Assembler. Holly wrote his BBS software on his own due to the lack of available BBS software options for the TI-99/4A. Months later, he discovered Mr. Fowler's TIBBS in Atlanta.

SoftWorx
Houston, Texas based programmer Mark Shields wrote a BBS program called SoftWorx in the summer of 1983 which served his board The USS Enterprise. Shields' inspiration came after watching the motion picture WarGames. The application originally made outgoing calls in an attempt to locate other computers, and was eventually adapted to accept calls. The user interface was modeled directly on Nick Naimo's Networks II BBS software which had been written for the Apple 2. Shields used TI Extended BASIC as the basis for his application. No actual code from the Naimo's software was used, although the online experience to modem users at the time was comparable. Shields donated the application to the public domain and several sites briefly sprang up in the 1980s.

TI-COMM
John Clulow gave away this program, whose unique feature was its use of a modified Volksmodem.  A sysop could modify an inexpensive Volksmodem to add auto-answer and auto-dial capability, for $30 in parts.  Because TI-COMM was written entirely in TI Extended Basic, it relied on PRINT and INPUT commands and the routines built-in to the RS232 DSR ROM.  As such, it could only do line-oriented input and output.  John Clulow was a prolific contributor to users' group newsletters.

Techie 
Monty Schmidt released Techie as freeware in 1985.  It used many assembly language support routines, but still ran from TI Extended Basic in 40-column text mode. Techie featured multiple message boards. An online adventure game came with the initial release.  Monty had been programming the TI-99/4A since 1981, and was a student at University of Wisconsin, Madison at the time of Techie's release.  Monty Schmidt started the software company Sonic Foundry in 1991.

TI-SUB (TI-Net BBS) 

Erik Olson wrote and marketed this BBS software in 1985, while in junior high school.  Matt Storm operated the flagship bulletin board, The Panhandler, a reference to the region around Lubbock, Texas, USA.  Lubbock was the birthplace of the TI-99/4A, but the 806 area code had not yet had a BBS running on one. 

TI-SUB, soon renamed TI-Net BBS, was written in TI Extended Basic, with assembly language support routines for RS232 communications and 40-column text mode.   About 30 copies were distributed.   A notable feature was a function key which allowed the sysop to enter or exit chat mode at any time (modeled after the chat function in ABBS.)  Other keys could alter privilege levels or gracefully end the user's session. The sysop could modify any of the prompts used in the software by editing one text file.  Screens, such as menus, were also loaded from simple text files.  

TI-Net BBS featured "Doors" or external programs that a caller could launch.  The standard software distribution has a conversion of Sam Moore, Jr's adventure game SWORDS, and an original DUNGEON game with competition between players, written by Matt Storm. Greg McGill ported many more games to run with TI-Net.

References 

Bulletin board system software
TI-99/4A